Luis Carlos Fariña Olivera (born 20 April 1991) is an Argentine professional footballer who plays as an attacking midfielder for Paraguayan Primera División club Cerro Porteño.

Club career
Born in Buenos Aires, Fariña graduated from Racing Club de Avellaneda's youth system. He made his professional debut on 28 August 2009, replacing Sebastián Grazzini in a 1–1 home draw against Club Atlético Colón for the Argentine Primera División championship. Fariña appeared sparingly in the following campaigns, mainly used as a backup. He was only utilized regularly in the 2012–13 campaign, after profiting from both Giovanni Moreno and Lucas Castro's departures.

Fariña scored his first professional goals on 19 November 2012, netting a brace in a 4–0 home win against Quilmes Atlético Club. He finished the season with 28 matches and four goals, attracting the interest of S.L. Benfica, S.C. Braga and Sporting CP.

On 24 July 2013 Fariña signed for Benfica on a five-year deal for €3.5 million, joining fellow Racing teammates José Shaffer and José Luis Fernández. On 9 August, however, he was loaned to UAE Arabian Gulf League side Baniyas SC, in a season-long deal. On 27 July 2014, Fariña moved to Deportivo de La Coruña also in a temporary deal. He made his La Liga debut on 23 August, starting in a 1–2 away loss against Granada CF. Fariña scored his first goal in the main category of Spanish football on 15 December, netting the winner in a home success over Elche CF.

In August 2015, he joined Rayo Vallecano on loan for one season, until it was terminated early in January 2016, with the Argentine moving to Universidad de Chile until June. On 7 August 2016, Fariña moved to Greek Super League club Asteras Tripoli in another temporary deal. A year later, the 26-year-old Fariña rescinded his contract with Benfica, without ever representing them, and signed a three-year contract with Aves.

Personal life
Fariña's parents were born in Paraguay, with himself also holding a Paraguayan citizenship since December 2014.

Honours
Racing Club
 Copa Argentina: Runner-up 2011–12

Aves
Taça de Portugal: 2017–18

References

External links
 
 Luis Fariña – Argentine Primera statistics at Fútbol XXI  
 
 
 

1991 births
Living people
Footballers from Buenos Aires
Argentine sportspeople of Paraguayan descent
Argentine footballers
Association football midfielders
Argentine Primera División players
Racing Club de Avellaneda footballers
Primeira Liga players
S.L. Benfica footballers
UAE Pro League players
Baniyas Club players
La Liga players
Deportivo de La Coruña players
Rayo Vallecano players
Universidad de Chile footballers
Asteras Tripolis F.C. players
Super League Greece players
C.D. Aves players
Argentine expatriate footballers
Expatriate footballers in Portugal
Expatriate footballers in Spain
Expatriate footballers in Qatar
Expatriate footballers in Chile
Expatriate footballers in Greece
Argentine expatriate sportspeople in Qatar
Argentine expatriate sportspeople in Portugal
Argentine expatriate sportspeople in Spain
Argentine expatriate sportspeople in Chile
Cerro Porteño players